The 1994–95 Mississippi State Bulldogs men's basketball team represented Mississippi State University in the 1994–95 NCAA Division I men's basketball season. Led by head coach Richard Williams, the Bulldogs reached the Sweet Sixteen of the 1995 NCAA tournament before losing to eventual National Champion UCLA.

Roster

Schedule and results

|-
!colspan=9 style=| Regular season

|-
!colspan=9 style=| SEC Tournament

|-
!colspan=9 style=| NCAA Tournament

Sources

Rankings

References

Mississippi State
Mississippi State Bulldogs men's basketball seasons
Mississippi State